Drosera glanduligera, the pimpernel sundew, is a rosetted annual species in the carnivorous plant genus Drosera that is endemic to Australia. It produces orange flowers from August to November. It was originally described in 1844 by Johann Georg Christian Lehmann. It is the sole species in the subgenus Coelophylla, which Jan Schlauer elevated from section rank in 1996; it was originally described by Jules Émile Planchon in 1848.

Distribution
Drosera glanduligera is native to Tasmania and south western and south eastern Australia where it is often locally abundant.

Biology
Drosera glanduligera is an annual plant that grows in the winter. Germination of the seeds requires cold temperatures. Young plants eat springtails while larger plants eat flies.

The trapping mechanism of this species is unique in that it combines features of both flypaper and snap traps; it has been termed a catapult-flypaper trap. Non-flying insects trigger this catapult when certain plant cells break. Then this process cannot be repeated until the plant grows new tentacles.

Cultivation 
Drosera glanduligera can be a difficult plant to cultivate, mainly due to its stringent temperature requirements, both for germination and further growth.  Plants (especially seedlings) must be fed regularly in order to maintain vigour. The plant grows well in standard carnivorous plant soil mixes.

See also 
List of Drosera species

References 

Carnivorous plants of Australia
Caryophyllales of Australia
glanduligera
Eudicots of Western Australia
Plants described in 1844
Articles containing video clips